Bor Lake is an artificial lake in eastern Serbia (Bor District), at an altitude of , less than  from the city of Bor, about  south east from Belgrade. It is on the road from Bor to Žagubica. Hotels and country houses are built around Lake Bor, since it is a tourist attraction.

The lake is a result of the construction of a dam of the rivers Valja Dzoni, Marec and part of Zlot (Zlotska reka) which took place in 1959 for the operation of the mining and smelting company RTB Bor (Rudarsko topioničarski basen Bor DOO). It is surrounded by forests. On its shores there is one hotel and one camping. It is popular in the summer, when the water temperature reaches  and it has two beaches. There are also winter activities in the area, such as skiing in the close-by facilities of the Crni Vrh mountain. Other attractions in the area are the Brestovac Spa, the Stol mountain, Crni Vrh, Lazar's cave, Lazar's Canyon, Vratna Gates, Bor Zoo and the Gornjak monastery.

Gallery

References

Bor, Serbia
Bor District
Lakes of Serbia